Crac is a 1981 animated short film produced, written and directed by Frédéric Back.

Plot
The story follows the experiences of a rocking chair, from its creation from a tree through its time as a member of a Canadian farming family.

Reception and legacy
Crac won the 1981 Academy Award for Best Animated Short Film.

It also was part of Animation Show of Shows.

Animation critic Charles Solomon named it as one of the best animated films of the 1980s.

References

External links 

1981 films
1981 animated films
1980s animated short films
Best Animated Short Academy Award winners
Canadian animated short films
Films scored by Normand Roger
Films directed by Frédéric Back
Animated films without speech
1980s English-language films
1980s Canadian films